The Tsou (Tsou: Cou) are an indigenous people of central southern Taiwan. They are an Austronesian ethnic group. They reside in Chiayi County and Nantou County.

The Tsou numbered around 6,000, approximately 1.19% of Taiwan's total Indigenous population, making them the seventh-largest indigenous group. They are sometimes confused with the Thao people of Sun Moon Lake.

History

The Tsou are traditionally based in the Alishan area. Their rich oral histories describe migrations of each ancient clans' ancestors into the area between Yushan and the Chianan Plain. Originally, each clan had its own settlement, with the first multi-clan town, Tfuya, forming approximately 1600 CE. 

The earliest written record of the Tsou dates from the Dutch occupation, which describes the multi-clan settlement Tfuya as having approximately 300 people in 1647. Ethnologists have attempted to reconstruct the development of Tfuya, proposing that each stage of clan migration could be equivalent to three or four generations of family. Another Formosan group of Bunun origin called the Takopulan reportedly lived in the same area, but were absorbed by the Tsou. Their largest settlement had 450 people in 1647. During the Japanese colonial period, four Tsou groups were recorded: Tfuya, Tapangᵾ, Imucu and Luhtu.

Notable Tsous

 Francesca Kao, actress, singer and television host. Her native name is Paicʉ Yatauyungana.
 Tang Lanhua (湯蘭花), Taiwanese singer and actress. Her native name is Yurunana Daniiv.
 Tibusungu 'e Vayayana, Deputy Minister of the Council of Indigenous Peoples.
 Aikaterini Saini (湯蘭花), Taiwanese singer and math teacher. Her native name is Saini Tsou.

See also
 Tsou language
 Taiwanese indigenous peoples

References